Christopher Hugh Neal (born 1946) is an Australian musician, songwriter, record producer and television and film music composer.  His scores include Buddies, Bodyline, The Shiralee, Turtle Beach and Farscape. He has also scored and written songs for children's series including Johnson and Friends, Lift-Off, Crash Zone and Noah and Saskia.

Neal has won several AGSC and APRA awards for his work and was awarded Best Original Music Score at the 1985 AFI Awards for his contribution to the film score for 'Rebel'. Some of Neal's frequent collaborators have included Denny Lawrence, Bob Ellis, George Ogilvie, Matt Carroll, and Patricia Edgar.

Early life and career 
Neal was born in 1946 in Sydney, New South Wales, Australia. He studied AMEB grades in classical piano and music theory to the age of sixteen. He attended North Sydney Boys High School and in 1964, began an arts degree at Sydney University with majors in music and Indonesian/Malayan studies. During his Uni years, he gigged around Sydney with rock bands - The Showmen and The Powerhouse.

In 1968, he worked extensively on the soundtrack of the Anglo/Australian feature film, Age of Consent with Peter Sculthorpe, writing and producing the majority of the incidental score. 

On the eve of completing his degree, Neal suffered a skull fracture during a game of rugby. The resultant Inertia and Tinnitus caused massive hearing loss and sleeplessness which prevented him sitting his final exams. Following a brief convalescence, he joined "The Alpha-Omega Revue" and headed off to the Vietnam War zone, entertaining US troops for several months in 1968-9.

While in Vietnam, he began writing what was intended to be the world's first rock musical, "Man-Child". However, by the time he had returned to Australia, the American show 'Hair' was already in the headlines. 

Nevertheless, he packaged the show and presented it at the Sydney Showground in the world's first "bubble" air-inflated theatre (financed by his brother, developer James Neal). The season was cut short when a freak storm picked up a design fault in the plastic theatre and destroyed it. So the whole company (25 people in all) set off on a national capital city tour. 

The tour was successful, breaking box office records in several cities and a "Man-Child" soundtrack album was recorded for the then fledgling M7 record company. This caused Neal to turn his attentions for a time to the development of his skills as a record producer and sound engineer, while continuing to work as a songwriter and composer.

In 1974, he recorded his second album, an instrumental rock LP called "Winds of Isis". This record created widespread interest and is a highly sought after collector's item today. The album peaked at number 74 in Australia. The multi-layered keyboard and guitar instrumentation was composed, performed and arranged by Neal. Following this, he worked the Sydney scene as a session keyboardist and performed on literally hundreds of advertising and film soundtracks. "Winds of Isis - Remastered" was released as a streamable CD through Spotify, Apple, Deezer etc in 2021.

In 1978, Neal composed a complete score for Fritz Lang's silent movie masterpiece, "Metropolis". The score was created using the massive Roland System-700 and MC-8 data entry device. (The MC-8 was the world's first fully functioning digital music sequencer). The score was performed live with the movie around several venues in Sydney. A cinema release with synchronised score was in development when Giorgio Moroder announced the release of his version and the local movie producer withdrew, cancelling the project. "Metropolis - 1980" was released as a streamable CD through Spotify, Apple, Deezer etc in 2021.

In 1980, Neal again used the Roland system to create an electronic soundtrack for the feature film - Crosstalk. The score was released on vinyl and is still available today.

As a record producer 
During the seventies Neal produced records for the likes of the Marshall Brothers Band, the Nick Boston band, John Currie, Slim De Grey, Frankie Davidson and Lester Coombs.

He produced Bob Hudson's smash hit "The Newcastle Song" and Maureen Elkner's hit single "Rak Off Normie", (co-written by Hudson and Neal).

As a screen composer 
Neal's screen composer credits date from the late 1970s and include The Shiralee, Bodyline, Buddies, Rebel, Archer, Shadow of The Cobra and Emerald City. 

During the 1980s, Neal scored several films from the "Winners" series of telemovies, produced by Patricia Edgar of the Australian Children's Television Foundation. Five Times Dizzy, produced by Tom Jeffrey followed soon after. These projects kickstarted what would be a recurring part of his career; scoring and writing songs for children's television dramas including the timeless Johnson and Friends, Lift-Off, Kaboodle, Li'l Elvis and the Truckstoppers and more. Neal's songs and music were also featured in stage shows based on "Johnson and Friends", and in 1995-1996, Neal wrote the music for "Lift Off Live"; a stage musical based on the "Lift-Off" television series.

Feature film and television projects continued through the 1990s and 2000s, including Pacific Drive, Foreign Exchange and many more.

Personal life and current activities 
In 2018, Neal donated his music archive to independent historian and archivist Joseph Marshall, who Neal has mentored for many years. Marshall has taken up the responsibility of preserving and digitising Neal's catalogue and is the owner and operator of indie record label Silbert Records, which specialises in remastered children's television soundtrack releases including several of Neal's.

As a songwriter 
Recently, Neal has taken a step back from film scoring to write and release his own, independent rock-based songs under the pseudonym Sirclo. The first of these projects, "Songs for an Empty Street", was released digitally (via streaming platforms) in 2018. Two follow-up albums have been released in 2020 / 2021 - "High Time - Songs From The Musical" and "70s Unreleased" (a re-mastering of a dozen songs written and recorded in the 70s, several in collaboration with lyricist, Henrietta Metcalfe). 

In 2021, Sirclo (and friends), using the name Riff Gun, released a collection of blues/rock songs entitled "Not Robinson Crusoe" via Spotify, Apple Music, Deezer and several other streaming services.

Film and television credits
 "Mutiny on the Western Front" (1979)
 "Crosstalk" (1982)
 "Drought" (1982)
 "The Disappearance of Azaria Chamberlain" (1983)
 "The City's Edge" (1983)
 "What Price Valour?" (1983)
 "Crime of the Decade" (1984)
 "Water Babies" (1984)
 "Winners" (1984) ['Top Kid', 'Tarflowers' and 'Quest Beyond Time']
 "Bodyline" (1984)
 "Palace of Dreams" (1985)
 "CBS Storybreak" (1985) ['Hank the Cowdog' and 'Dragon's Blood']
 "Archer" (1985)
 "Rebel" (1985)
 "Five Times Dizzy" (1985)
 "Niel Lynne" (1985)
 "Short Changed" (1985)
 "Around the World in 80 Ways" (1985)
 "The Long Way Home" (1985)
 "Double Sculls" (1985)
 "Natural Causes" (1985)
 "Bullseye" (1986/1987)
 "The Place at the Coast" (1986/1987)
 "Army Wives" (1986/1987)
 "Ground Zero" (1987)
 "The Shiralee" (1987)
 "Future Past" (1987)
 "Emerald City" (1988)
 "Grievous Bodily Harm" (1988)
 "Computer Ghosts" (1988)
 "Mary MacKillop" (1988)
 "Soldier Settler" (1988)
 "Touch the Sun" (1988) ['Peter and Pompey' and 'Princess Kate']
 "Barracuda" (1988)
 "Shadow of the Cobra" (1989)
 "Celia" (1989)
 "More Winners" (1989) ['The Big Wish']
 "A Country Practice" (1989)
 "Afraid to Dance" (1989)
 "Trouble in Paradise" (1989/1990)
 "Johnson & Friends" (1990) [Series 1]
 "The New Adventures of Black Beauty" (1990) [Series 1]
 "The Paper Man" (1990)
 "Turtle Beach" (1991)
 "G.P." (1991) [Series 3]
 "Johnson & Friends" (1991) [Series 2]
 "The Nostradamus Kid" (1992)
 "Lift-Off" (1992) [Series 1]
 "The New Adventures of Black Beauty" (1992) [Series 2] (Co-composed with Braedy Neal)
 "Butterfly Island" (1992)
 "The Sharp End: Witnesses of Vietnam" (1992)
 "Round the Twist" (1992) [Series 2 - Episode 11]
 "G.P." (1992) [Series 4]
 "Law of the Land" (1993)
 "EC Plays Lift-Off" (1993)
 "Jack Be Nimble" (1993)
 "G.P." (1993) [Series 5]
 "Heartland" (1994) (Co-composed with Braedy Neal)
 "The Damnation of Harvey McHugh" (1994)
 "G.P." (1994) [Series 6] (Co-composed with Braedy Neal)
 "Johnson & Friends" (1994) [Series 3]
 "Lift-Off" (1995) [Series 2] (Co-composed with Braedy Neal)
 "Correlli" (1995)
 "Johnson & Friends" (1995) [Series 4] (Co-composed with Braedy Neal)
 "Pacific Drive" (1996) [Series 1] (Co-composed with Braedy Neal)
 "Pacific Drive" (1997) [Series 2] (Co-composed with Braedy Neal)
 "13 Gantry Row" (1998)
 "Mumbo Jumbo" (1998)
 "Crash Zone" (1998/1999) [Series 1] (Co-composed with Braedy Neal)
 "Time and Tide" (1999)
 "Farscape" (1999-2000) [Episodes 1-26] (Co-composed with Braedy Neal and Toby Neal under the name SubVision)
 "Crash Zone" (2001) [Series 2] (Co-composed with Braedy Neal)
 "The Crop" (2003/2004) (Co-composed with Braedy Neal)
 "Noah and Saskia" (2004) (Co-composed with Braedy Neal)
 "Foreign Exchange" (2004) (Co-composed with Braedy Neal)
 "MDA" (2005) [Series 3, Episodes 5-8] 
 "The Sleepover Club" (2006) [Series 2] (Co-composed with Braedy Neal)
 "Between Iraq and a Hard Place" (2008)
 "Castaway" (2010)

Discography
 "Man-Child" (1972) - musical cast recording.
 "Winds of Isis" (1974) - solo progressive rock album.
 "The Newcastle Song" (1974) (Bob Hudson) [as Producer]
 "Darwin Opera House Appeal" (1975) [as co producer]
 "The Marshall Bros." (1975) [as Producer]
 "Benny and the Jets" (1975) [as Producer]
 "Rak Off Normie" (1975) (Maureen Elkner) [as Producer and writer]
 "The Word Was Gough" (1975) [as Producer and writer]
 "Tasmanian Military Tattoo" (1976) [as Producer]
 "Picnic at Hanging Rock" (1976) (Nolan/Buddle Quartet) [as Producer]
 "Steph. 'n' Us" 1977 (Stéphane Grappelli) [as Engineer]
 "Great Hits of Scotland" (1977) (John McDonald) [as Producer]
 "Francis Butler" (1978) [as Producer]
 "Hokum Ensemble" (1978) [as Producer]
 "Rod Boucher" (1980) [as Producer]
 "Crosstalk" (1981) - movie soundtrack.
 "Buddies" (1984) - movie soundtrack.
 "Turtle Beach" (1991) - movie soundtrack.
 "An Afternoon with Johnson and Friends" (1992) - children's album based on a popular television series.
 Seven soundtrack recordings for "Lift Off" ranging from 1992-1995 - children's television soundtracks.
 "Heartland" (1994) - television soundtrack.
 "Johnson and Friends - Making Music" (1994) - children's television soundtrack.
 "Lift-Off Live - Songs from the Musical" (1995) - children's musical cast recording.
 "Songs from Li'l Elvis Jones and the Truckstoppers" (1998) - children's television soundtrack.
 "Farscape" (2001) - television soundtrack.
 "Themes" (2005) - a compilation of popular movie and television themes.
 "Cooling Pond" (2008) - independent project, co written and produced with collaborator Ian Davidson.
 "Songs For an Empty Street" (2018) - alternative/indie rock album under the name Sirclo.
"High Time - Songs from the Musical" (2021) - concept album for a cancelled stage musical project, released under the name Sirclo and Friends.
"70s Unreleased" (2021) - a collection of unreleased songs from the 1970s, released under the name Sirclo.
"Not Robinson Crusoe" (2021) - a collection of blues/rock songs released under the name Riff Gun.
"Winds of Isis - Remastered" (2021) - a remastered re-release of the prog rock classic from 1974.
"Metropolis 1980" (2021) - A remastered compilation consisting of the majority of the score for the cult classic film 'Metropolis'.

References

External links
 http://chrisnealmusic.com - Chris Neal's website.

Australian songwriters
20th-century births
Australian male composers
Australian male musicians
Australian composers
Living people
Australian children's musicians
Year of birth missing (living people)